Plutographa is a genus of moths belonging to the subfamily Olethreutinae of the family Tortricidae.

Species
Plutographa anopa Diakonoff, 1989
Plutographa authodes Diakonoff, 1992
Plutographa brochota Diakonoff, 1989
Plutographa cryphaea Diakonoff, 1989
Plutographa cyanea Diakonoff, 1989
Plutographa cyclops Diakonoff, 1970
Plutographa dyspotma Diakonoff, 1989
Plutographa erytema Diakonoff, 1989
Plutographa eudela Diakonoff, 1989
Plutographa glochydosema Diakonoff, 1989
Plutographa heteranthera Diakonoff, 1970
Plutographa latefracta Diakonoff, 1989
Plutographa lichenophyes Diakonoff, 1989
Plutographa microsarca Diakonoff, 1989
Plutographa monopa Diakonoff, 1989
Plutographa nigrivittata Diakonoff, 1989
Plutographa orbiculi Diakonoff, 1989
Plutographa phloena Diakonoff, 1989
Plutographa phloeorrhages (Diakonoff, 1970)
Plutographa pictura (Diakonoff, 1970)
Plutographa reducta Diakonoff, 1989
Plutographa rhodana Diakonoff, 1989
Plutographa semna Diakonoff, 1989
Plutographa seriopa Diakonoff, 1989
Plutographa spodostoma Diakonoff, 1989
Plutographa tetracelis Diakonoff, 1989
Plutographa tomion Diakonoff, 1989
Plutographa transversa (Diakonoff, 1970)
Plutographa xyloglypha Diakonoff, 1989

See also
List of Tortricidae genera

References

External links
tortricidae.com

Tortricidae genera
Olethreutinae
Taxa named by Alexey Diakonoff